Amy Jean Klobuchar (born May 25, 1960) is an American politician and lawyer serving as the senior United States senator from Minnesota, a seat she has held since 2007. A member of the Minnesota Democratic–Farmer–Labor Party (DFL), Minnesota's affiliate of the Democratic Party, she previously served as the attorney of Hennepin County.

Born in Plymouth, Minnesota, Klobuchar graduated from Yale University and the University of Chicago Law School. She was a partner at two Minneapolis law firms before being elected county attorney of Hennepin County in 1998, making her responsible for all criminal prosecution in Minnesota's most populous county. Klobuchar was first elected to the Senate in 2006, succeeding Mark Dayton to become Minnesota's first elected female United States senator. She was reelected by a landslide in 2012, winning almost all of the state's 87 counties. Klobuchar was reelected again in 2018. In 2009 and 2010, she was described as a "rising star" in the Democratic Party.

Klobuchar's political positions align with modern liberalism. She has focused on healthcare reform, consumer protection, agriculture, and climate change. She is known for her folksy, Midwestern demeanor and ability to win in rural Minnesota.

On February 10, 2019, Klobuchar announced her candidacy for the Democratic nomination for president of the United States in the 2020 election; on March 2, 2020, she suspended her campaign and endorsed Joe Biden. In 2021, she became the chair of the Senate Rules Committee.

Early life and education
Born in Plymouth, Minnesota, Klobuchar is the daughter of Rose (née Heuberger) and Jim Klobuchar. Her mother taught second grade until she retired at age 70. Her father Jim, a retired sportswriter and columnist for the Star Tribune, was of Slovene descent.

Klobuchar's parents divorced when she was 15. The divorce took a toll on the family; her relationship with her father was not fully restored until he quit drinking in the 1990s.

She attended public schools in Plymouth and was valedictorian at Wayzata High School, where she was also class treasurer and secretary. She received her Bachelor of Arts magna cum laude in political science in 1982 from Yale University. While at Yale, Klobuchar spent time as an intern for then-Vice President and former senator Walter Mondale. Her senior thesis, Uncovering the Dome, a 250-page history of the ten years of politics surrounding the building of the Hubert H. Humphrey Metrodome in Minneapolis, was published by Waveland Press in 1986. After Yale, Klobuchar enrolled at the University of Chicago Law School, where she served as an associate editor of the University of Chicago Law Review and earned her Juris Doctor magna cum laude in 1985.

Early career
After law school, Klobuchar worked as a corporate lawyer. Before seeking public office, besides working as a prosecutor, Klobuchar was a partner at the Minnesota law firms Dorsey & Whitney and Gray Plant Mooty, where she specialized in "regulatory work in telecommunications law". Her first foray into politics came after she gave birth and was forced to leave the hospital 24 hours later, a situation exacerbated by the fact that Klobuchar's daughter, Abigail, was born with a disorder that prevented her from swallowing. The experience led Klobuchar to appear before the Minnesota State Legislature, advocating for a bill that would guarantee new mothers a 48-hour hospital stay. Minnesota passed the bill and President Clinton later made the policy federal law.

Klobuchar was first a candidate for public office in 1994 when she ran for Hennepin County attorney. But she had pledged to drop out if the incumbent, Michael Freeman, got back in the race after failing to win the endorsement of the Minnesota Democratic–Farmer–Labor (DFL) Party for governor. Klobuchar quit the race in June 1994 and supported Freeman for reelection. Before running for office, Klobuchar was active in supporting DFL candidates, including Freeman in 1990. The county attorney election is nonpartisan, but Freeman, like Klobuchar, is a Democrat.

Klobuchar was elected Hennepin County attorney in 1998 (Freeman declined to run for another term) and was reelected in 2002 with no opposition. Minnesota Lawyer named her "Attorney of the Year". Klobuchar was President of the Minnesota County Attorneys Association from November 2002 to November 2003. After the murder of George Floyd in Minneapolis Police custody, Klobuchar was criticized for her lack of prosecution of police misconduct during her tenure, including a case involving the officer, Derek Chauvin, who was later found guilty of murdering Floyd. The case was not heard until after she left office.

U.S. Senate

Elections

2006 

In early 2005, after U.S. senator Mark Dayton announced that he would not seek reelection, Klobuchar became an early favorite for the DFL nomination for the 2006 election. EMILY's List endorsed her on September 29, 2005, and Klobuchar won the DFL endorsement on June 9, 2006. She gained the support of the majority of DFL state legislators in Minnesota during the primaries. A poll of DFL state delegates showed Klobuchar beating her then closest opponent, Patty Wetterling, 66% to 15%. In January Wetterling dropped out of the race and endorsed Klobuchar. Former Senate candidate and prominent lawyer Mike Ciresi, who was widely seen as a serious potential DFL candidate, indicated in early February that he would not enter the race; that was viewed as an important boost for Klobuchar.

In the general election Klobuchar faced Republican candidate Mark Kennedy, Independence Party candidate Robert Fitzgerald, Constitution candidate Ben Powers, and Green Party candidate Michael Cavlan. Klobuchar led in the polls throughout the campaign, and won with 58% of the vote to Kennedy's 38% and Fitzgerald's 3%, carrying all but eight of Minnesota's 87 counties. She is the first woman to be elected U.S. senator from Minnesota. (Muriel Humphrey, the state's first female senator and former second lady of the United States, was appointed to fill her husband's unexpired term and not elected.)

2012 

Klobuchar won a second term in the U.S. Senate, defeating Republican State Representative Kurt Bills by a margin of 35 percentage points (65.23% to 30.53%), carrying all but two counties.

2018 

Klobuchar ran for a third term and was reelected by a 24-point margin. The Republican nominee was state representative Jim Newberger. The race was not seen as close, with Klobuchar outraising Newberger $9.9 million to $210,066 as of October 17. Klobuchar maintained a double-digit lead in the polls all autumn.

Tenure
A September 2009 poll found 58% of Minnesotans approved of the job Klobuchar was doing and 36% disapproved. On March 12, 2010, Rasmussen Reports indicated 67% of Minnesotans approved of the job she was doing. The Winona Daily News described her as a "rare politician who works across the aisle". Walter Mondale said, "She has done better in that miserable Senate than most people there."

At the end of the 114th Congress in late 2016, Klobuchar had passed more legislation than any other senator. In February 2017 she called for an independent, bipartisan commission to investigate ties between Russia and President Donald Trump and his administration. Concern about Trump's ties to Russia increased after reports that his campaign officials had repeated contact with senior Russian intelligence officials before the 2016 United States elections. Klobuchar had already signaled her interest in U.S.–Russia relations in December 2016 when she joined Republican senators John McCain and Lindsey Graham on a trip to the Baltic states and Ukraine. She maintained high approval ratings throughout 2017, with an April 2017 Star Tribune poll placing her approval rating at 72%. In October 2017 Morning Consult listed Klobuchar among the 10 senators with the highest approval ratings, and a November 2017 KSTP-TV poll put her approval rating at 56%. An April 2019 Morning Consult poll found Klobuchar to be the third-most popular sitting senator, with a 58% approval rating and 26% disapproval rating, behind only Vermont senators Bernie Sanders and Patrick Leahy.

According to the Center for Effective Lawmaking, Klobuchar scored "above expectations" with respect to how successful she was at moving significant legislation in the 115th Congress (2017–18).

During the Brett Kavanaugh Supreme Court nomination hearings in 2018, Kavanaugh gave heated responses to Klobuchar's questions about whether he had ever experienced memory loss after consuming alcohol, for which he later apologized.

In February 2019, BuzzFeed News reported that interviews with former staffers and reviews of emails indicated that Klobuchar frequently abused and humiliated her employees, requiring significant staff time to manage her ire. The article reported that other employees found her to be "fair and effective" and a good boss. Politico reported that Klobuchar had the highest annual staff turnover rate of any senator—36%—between 2011 and 2016. A Huffington Post article alleged she had a reputation for mistreating her staff, with some staff alleging she was prone to bursts of cruelty. In response to the negative reports, 61 former staffers wrote an open letter praising Klobuchar, stating that she was a caring "mentor and friend" to them.

In the 115th Congress, she was absent for 0.5% of votes, with two-thirds of the senators missing more votes. In the ongoing 116th Congress (Jan 2019–Jan 2021), during her campaign for president, as of January 2020, she missed 39.1% of votes, making her the 5th most absent member of the Senate.

Klobuchar was at the U.S. Capitol when Trump supporters stormed it on January 6, 2021. As ranking Democrat on the Senate Rules Committee, she and Senator Roy Blunt co-led Senate deliberations during the 2021 United States Electoral College vote count. She also served as a teller, along with Blunt, Representative Rodney Davis, and Representative Zoe Lofgren. After Senate Republicans, led by Senator Ted Cruz, objected to certifying Arizona's electoral votes, Klobuchar participated in the debate on the Senate floor. Shortly after she gave her remarks, the Capitol was breached. As the Senate adjourned, Klobuchar was alerted on her phone that shots were fired inside the Capitol, which she announced to those present. Immediately, Klobuchar, fellow senators, staff and journalists were evacuated from the chambers to a secure location. When the Capitol was secure, Congress reconvened and the election count was certified in the early morning of January 7. Klobuchar supported the certification. Later that day, Klobuchar said she supported the invocation of the Twenty-fifth Amendment to the United States Constitution to remove Trump from office "because you cannot have a president basically leading an insurrection against our own country's government." She also called for investigations into the breach.

Klobuchar was the first speaker at Joe Biden's inauguration on January 20, 2021.

Committee assignments

117th Congress
In the 117th Congress, Klobuchar serves on the following standing committees:
Committee on Agriculture, Nutrition, and Forestry
Subcommittee on Conservation, Climate, Forestry, and Natural Resources
Subcommittee on Food and Nutrition, Specialty Crops, Organics, and Research
Subcommittee on Rural Development and Energy
Committee on Commerce, Science, and Transportation
Subcommittee on Communications, Media, and Broadband
Subcommittee on Consumer Protection, Product Safety, and Data Security
Subcommittee on Surface Transportation, Maritime, Freight, and Ports
Subcommittee on Tourism, Trade, and Export Promotion
Committee on the Judiciary
Subcommittee on Competition Policy, Antitrust, and Consumer Rights (chair)
Subcommittee on Criminal Justice and Counterterrorism
Subcommittee on Immigration, Citizenship, and Border Safety
Subcommittee on Privacy, Technology, and the Law
Committee on Rules and Administration (chair)
Joint Committee on the Library (ex officio)
Joint Committee on Printing (ex officio)
Joint Economic Committee

116th Congress
In the 116th Congress, Klobuchar served on the following standing committees:
 Committee on Agriculture, Nutrition and Forestry
 Subcommittee on Conservation, Forestry and Natural Resources
 Subcommittee on Livestock, Marketing and Agriculture Security
 Subcommittee on Rural Development and Energy
 Committee on Commerce, Science and Transportation
 Subcommittee on Communications, Technology, Innovation, and the Internet
 Subcommittee on Manufacturing, Trade, and Consumer Protection
 Subcommittee on Transportation and Safety
 Subcommittee on Security
 Committee on the Judiciary
 Subcommittee on Antitrust, Competition Policy and Consumer Rights (ranking member)
 Subcommittee on Crime and Terrorism
 Subcommittee on Border Security and Immigration
 Subcommittee on Oversight, Agency Action, Federal Rights, and Federal Courts
 Committee on Rules and Administration (ranking member)
 Joint Committee on the Library (ex officio)
 Joint Committee on Printing (ex officio)
 Joint Economic Committee

Other Congresses
In her first Congress, the 110th Congress, Klobuchar was assigned to the following committees:
 Committee on Agriculture, Nutrition and Forestry
 Committee on Commerce, Science and Transportation
 Committee on Environment and Public Works
 Joint Economic Committee

Caucus memberships
 Congressional NextGen 9-1-1 Caucus

Role in the Democratic Party
On March 30, 2008, Klobuchar announced her endorsement of Senator Barack Obama in the Democratic presidential primary, promising her superdelegate vote to him. She cited his performance in the Minnesota caucuses, where he won with 66% of the popular vote, as well as her own "independent judgment". In 2016 she was an early supporter of Hillary Clinton's second campaign for the Democratic presidential nomination.

Klobuchar has served as the chair of the U.S. Senate Democratic Steering and Outreach Committee since 2015. She became the Steering Chair of the community in 2017, with Bernie Sanders as Outreach Chair. Both represented the Democratic Party in a 2017 televised debate on healthcare policy and the possible repeal of the Affordable Care Act on CNN.

In 2020, Klobuchar was named a candidate for Secretary of Agriculture or United States Attorney General in the Biden Administration.

2020 presidential campaign

The New York Times and The New Yorker named Klobuchar as one of the women most likely to become the first female president of the United States, and MSNBC and The New Yorker named her as a possible nominee to the U.S. Supreme Court.

On February 10, 2019, Klobuchar announced her candidacy in the 2020 Democratic Party presidential primaries. She has said that she uses humor as one way to distinguish herself among the many other Democratic candidates in the 2020 campaign.

On January 19, 2020, The New York Times editorial board endorsed Klobuchar and Elizabeth Warren for president.

On March 2, 2020, the day before Super Tuesday, Klobuchar suspended her campaign and endorsed Joe Biden.

On May 21, 2020, it was reported that Biden asked several women, including Klobuchar, to undergo formal vetting for consideration as his vice-presidential running mate. On June 18, Klobuchar withdrew herself from consideration, saying that Biden should choose a woman of color.

Political positions

Klobuchar's political positions have generally been in line with modern American liberalism. She is pro-choice on abortion, supports LGBT rights and the Affordable Care Act, and was critical of the Iraq War. During the 115th Congress, she voted in line with President Donald Trump's position on legislation 31.1 percent of the time.

According to GovTrack, Klobuchar passed more legislation than any other senator by the end of the 114th Congress in late 2016. According to Congress.gov, she had sponsored or co-sponsored 111 pieces of legislation that became law.

Personal life and family
In 1993, Klobuchar married John Bessler, a private practice attorney and a professor at the University of Baltimore School of Law. They have a daughter who graduated from Yale University and worked as a legislative director for New York councilman Keith Powers.

Klobuchar is a member of the United Church of Christ and is a cousin of musician Zola Jesus.

In September 2021, Klobuchar revealed that she had been diagnosed with Stage 1A breast cancer in February 2021, that she had undergone a successful lumpectomy, and that in May she had completed a course of radiation treatment. In August, her doctors determined that the treatments had all been successful and she was cancer-free.

Klobuchar's grandparents were immigrants from Slovenia's White Carniola region. Her paternal grandfather was a miner on Minnesota's Iron Range. Amy's maternal grandparents emigrated from Switzerland to the United States.

Electoral history

Hennepin County Attorney

U.S. Senate
Note: The ±% column reflects the change in total number of votes won by each party from the previous election.

Books

Klobuchar has written three books. In 1986, she published Uncovering the Dome, a case study of the 10-year political struggle to build the Hubert H. Humphrey Metrodome. In 2015, she published an autobiography, The Senator Next Door: A Memoir from the Heartland. In 2021, Antitrust: Taking on Monopoly Power from the Gilded Age to the Digital Age was published, a sprawling, 624-page historical overview of antitrust law in the United States, up to the current regulatory issues facing Big Tech, the American public, and the world.

Awards and honors
Klobuchar has received a number of awards during her career. Minnesota Lawyer named her "Attorney of the Year" in 2001 and Mothers Against Drunk Driving gave her a leadership award for advocating for successful passage of Minnesota's first felony DWI law. Working Mother named her a 2008 "Best in Congress" for her efforts on behalf of working families, and The American Prospect named her a "woman to watch".

In 2012, Klobuchar received the Sheldon Coleman Great Outdoors Award at a special Great Outdoors Week celebration presented by the American Recreation Coalition. She was one of the recipients of the Agricultural Retailers Association's 2012 Legislator of the Year Award, alongside Republican representative John Mica. In 2013, Klobuchar received an award for her leadership in the fight to prevent sexual assault in the military at a national summit hosted by the Service Women's Action Network (SWAN). Also, in 2013, she received a Friend of CACFP award for her leadership in passing the Healthy Hunger Free Kids act and her efforts to set new nutrition standards for all meals served in the CACFP by the National Child and Adult Care Food Program (CACFP) Sponsors Association. Klobuchar and Senator Al Franken received the 2014 Friends of Farm Bureau Award from the Minnesota branch of the American Farm Bureau Federation. She received the American Bar Association's Congressional Justice Award in 2015 for her efforts to protect vulnerable populations from violence, exploitation, and assault and to eliminate discrimination in the workplace. Also in 2015 the National Consumers League honored Klobuchar with the Trumpeter Award for her work "on regulation to strengthen consumer product safety legislation, on ensuring a fair and competitive marketplace, and increasing accessibility to communications, specifically in the wireless space". In 2016, she received the Goodwill Policymaker Award from Goodwill Industries for her commitment to the nonprofit sector and leading the Nonprofit Energy Efficiency Act. In 2017, she received the Arabella Babb Mansfield Award from the National Association of Women Lawyers and was chosen as the Mary Louise Smith Chair in Women and Politics for the Carrie Chapman Catt Center at Iowa State University. In 2021, Klobuchar received the Award for Distinguished Public Service from the Association of American Publishers.

See also

 Barack Obama Supreme Court candidates
 Women in the United States Senate

Notes

Footnotes

External links

 Senator Amy Klobuchar official U.S. Senate website
 Amy Klobuchar for Senate
 

 
 "The Audacity of Minnesota: Senator Amy Klobuchar", Elle, Lisa DePaulo, March 30, 2010
 Collected coverage from Minnesota Public Radio – Campaign 2006: Amy Klobuchar

|-

|-

|-

|-

|-

|-

|-

|-

|-

|-

|-

 
1960 births
21st-century American politicians
21st-century American women politicians
American autobiographers
American people of Slovenian descent
American people of Swiss descent
American prosecutors
American women lawyers
Candidates in the 2020 United States presidential election
Democratic Party United States senators from Minnesota
Female candidates for President of the United States
Female United States senators
Living people
Minnesota Democrats
Minnesota lawyers
People from Plymouth, Minnesota
University of Chicago Law School alumni
Women autobiographers
Women in Minnesota politics
Writers from Minnesota
Yale University alumni